Progress M-39 was a Russian unmanned Progress cargo spacecraft, which was launched in May 1998 to resupply the Mir space station.

Launch
Progress M-39 launched on 14 May 1998 from the Baikonur Cosmodrome in Kazakhstan. It used a Soyuz-U rocket.

Docking
Progress M-39 docked with the aft port of the Kvant-1 module of Mir on 16 May 1998 at 23:50:33 UTC, and was undocked on 12 August 1998 at 09:28:52 UTC, to make way for Soyuz TM-28. Following the redocking of Soyuz TM-28 to the Mir Core Module forward port, Progress M-39 was redocked to the Kvant-1 aft port on 1 September 1998 at 05:34:40 UTC. Progress M-39 was finally undocked on 25 October 1998 at 23:03:24 UTC.

Decay
It remained in orbit until 29 October 1998, when it was deorbited. The deorbit burn occurred at 03:27:00 UTC, with the mission ending at 04:14:52 UTC.

See also

 1998 in spaceflight
 List of Progress missions
 List of uncrewed spaceflights to Mir

References

Progress (spacecraft) missions
1998 in Kazakhstan
Spacecraft launched in 1998
Spacecraft which reentered in 1998
Spacecraft launched by Soyuz-U rockets